Zhengzhouxi (Zhengzhou West) railway station is a railway station of Zhengzhou–Xi'an high-speed railway located in Xingyang, Zhengzhou, Henan, China. The station was once named Xingyang South railway station and was renamed to the current name on 10 July 2014. It started operation on 18 December 2015. There is also a connecting line to the east of this station allowing trains to reach Zhengzhou railway station.

Station Layout

The station has 2 side platforms and 4 tracks. The station building is to the north of the platforms.

References

Railway stations in Henan
Railway stations in Zhengzhou
Stations on the Xuzhou–Lanzhou High-Speed Railway
Railway stations in China opened in 2015